"Ring on Her Finger, Time on Her Hands" is a song written by Don Goodman, Pam Rose and Mary Ann Kennedy and first recorded by American country music artist Lee Greenwood.   It was released in February 1982 as the second single from his album Inside Out.  Greenwood's version peaked at number 5 on the Billboard Hot Country Singles chart.  A cover was released by Reba McEntire in November 1995 as the second single from her album Starting Over.  McEntire's version reached number 9 on the Billboard Hot Country Singles & Tracks chart in February 1996.

Content
The song is about a married couple whose problems foreshadow the wife's decision to have an affair. The lyrics – mainly pronouns – are slightly changed, depending on whether the singer is a male or female.

The song begins with a young couple standing at the altar, promising to be faithful to one another for the rest of their lives. The bride recalls that, as pure as the white in her gown, she stood by her groom's side and vowed to love him until her death.

However, the couple's love life quickly sours, as the husband constantly leaves his wife alone at night; the reason – work, drinking with friends or an affair – is never specified. As the lonely nights begin to mount up, the wife, left to maintain in a three-bedroom home (or prison, as she puts it), observes that the "gold turned cold in (her) wedding band." Eventually, with the need and desire for physical intimacy still very much alive in her, she turns to a stranger to meet her sexual needs ("The arms of a stranger was the only place left to turn").

McEntire's version changes the pronouns to place the song in a female's perspective.

Chart performance

Lee Greenwood version

Year-end charts

Reba McEntire version

References

1982 singles
Lee Greenwood songs
1995 singles
Reba McEntire songs
Songs about infidelity
Songs written by Mary Ann Kennedy (American singer)
Songs written by Pam Rose
Song recordings produced by Tony Brown (record producer)
MCA Records singles
Songs written by Don Goodman (songwriter)
Song recordings produced by Jerry Crutchfield
1982 songs